Little Black Dress (lit. My Black Mini Dress) is a 2011 South Korean film starring Yoon Eun-hye, Park Han-byul, Cha Ye-ryun and Yoo In-na. Based on the 2009 chick lit novel My Black Mini Dress by Kim Min-seo, the film revolves around the dreams, failures, and friendship of four 24-year-old women still looking for a direction in life.

Plot
Yoo-min (Yoon Eun-hye), Hye-ji (Park Han-byul), Soo-jin (Cha Ye-ryun) and Min-hee (Yoo In-na) were the best of friends in college. While majoring in theater and film at an elite university, they were united by their passion for Seoul's clubbing scene and luxury shopping, but life isn't so easy now that they're in the real world. Clueless about what to do with her life, Yoo-min takes up a job as an assistant to a famous TV scriptwriter in order to buy an expensive black mini dress (or "little black dress"), but her work turns out to be babysitting her boss's twin boys. Rich girl Min-hee plans to study abroad but she's not going anywhere until she improves her English. Socialite Hye-ji shoots to fame after appearing in a Levi's ad, but her newfound stardom creates a rift with her friends. Aspiring actress Soo-jin is at her wit's end after failing so many auditions, and things only get worse when her father goes bankrupt.

Cast
Yoon Eun-hye as Lee Yoo-min  
Park Han-byul as Yoon Hye-ji 
Cha Ye-ryun as Choi Soo-jin 
Yoo In-na as Kang Min-hee 
Choi Yoon-young as Kim Young-mi
Lee Yong-woo as Seok-won
Jeon Soo-kyung as writer
Shin Dongho as Yoo Seung-won
Gil Eun-hye as assistant writer 
Lee Mi-do as pre-college girl
Moon Soo-jong as Yoo-min's father
Ko Gyu-pil as Yoo-shin
Ahn Chi-yong as Min-hee's father
Won Jong-rye as Min-hee's mother
Kim Choon-gi as Young-mi's father
Choi Min-geum as Young-mi's mother
Paul Stafford as English teacher
Lee Chun-hee as Soo-hwan (cameo)
Ko Chang-seok as director (cameo)
Shin Seung-hwan as assistant director (cameo)
Kim Kwang-kyu as pre-college girl's father (cameo)
Moon Hee-kyung as Yoo-min's mother (cameo)
Baek Soo-ryun as lottery ticket grandmother (cameo)

References

External links
  
 My Black Mini Dress at Naver 
 
 
 

2011 films
South Korean drama films
2010s female buddy films
2011 drama films
2010s South Korean films